Andrew "Andy" Cassell is a British Paralympic sailor who won gold at the 1996 Summer Paralympics, where the sport made its Paralympic debut.

Residing in Cowes on the Isle of Wight he had been sailing for decades before the Paralympics and worked for Ratsey and Lapthorne sailmakers sailing in high-profile yachting events. He was one of the early advocates of sailing being included in the Paralympics and in 1996 he founded the Andrew Cassell Foundation which purchased a fleet of sonar keelboats which have been used to introduce thousands of disabled people to sailing. The Foundation is still active 25 years later.

References

External links
 
 
 

British sailors
Paralympic sailors of Great Britain
English male sailors (sport)
Sailors at the 1996 Summer Paralympics
Sailors at the 2000 Summer Paralympics
Paralympic gold medalists for Great Britain
Medalists at the 1996 Summer Paralympics
Living people
Paralympic medalists in sailing
Year of birth missing (living people)